Vale Music was a Spanish record label founded and chaired by Ricardo Campoy. Together with executives Narcís Rebollo and Gabriel Blanco, who came from Campoy's previous record label, Max Music.
Universal Music Group acquired the label in 2006, thus forming part of the world's largest music company.

Its headquarters were in Barcelona, Spain and was founded at the end of 1997. It became the largest record label in Spain. The Spanish company started its career specializing in 'dance' music and compilation albums such as Caribe, Disco Estrella, Todo Éxitos and Superventas, besides being the record label of several television projects such as Crónicas Marcianas, Gran Hermano and Operación Triunfo.

Some of their artists have had great success since they left Spain to conquer new markets in other countries, such as David Bisbal, Manuel Carrasco and Juan Magán (Latin America, Europe, United States, Asia) and to a lesser extent, Rosario Flores, David Bustamante and María Isabel. They were also national successes singers such as Coyote Dax, Sonia and Selena, David Civera and King Africa.

The releases of Vale Music have generated worldwide sales of more than 14 million albums of individual artists and more than 7 million of compilation albums. The artists and repertoire are now under the label Universal Music Group.

Vale Music artists

References 

Spanish record labels
Record labels established in 1997
Record labels disestablished in 2011
1997 establishments in Spain
2011 disestablishments in Spain
Record labels established in 2017